The Wafi-Golpu mine is one of the largest gold mines in Papua New Guinea and in the world. The mine is located in the east of the country in Morobe Province. The mine has estimated reserves of 20 million oz of gold.

References 

Gold mines in Papua New Guinea